Church of the Disciples may refer to:

 Christian Church (Disciples of Christ), a mainline Protestant (religious) denomination
 Church of the Disciples (Boston), later, united with Arlington Street Church
 Church of the Disciples (New York City), later, Madison Avenue Congregational Church
 Church of the Disciples (Remus, Michigan)

See also
 Missionary Church of the Disciples of Jesus Christ. evangelical non-profit religious organization based in West Covina, California, US